The WOAA Senior AA Hockey League is a Canadian senior ice hockey league governed by the Western Ontario Athletic Association.  The league operates in Southwestern Ontario.

History

Format
The league uses Hockey Canada playing rules but is not operated under the jurisdictions of the Ontario Hockey Association or Hockey Canada. The league is based in the Georgian Triangle and Southwestern Ontario. The league has been in existence since 1943, one year after the WOAA itself was established, and has entertained large crowds with local former Junior Hockey players and the odd former professional player. The league is rather large and features teams of both Senior "AA" and Senior "A" calibre. It is generally accepted that none of these teams could financially compete with the Senior "AAA" teams that compete for the Allan Cup.

The league is divided into two division that do not interlock until the playoffs.  The WOAA consists of 17 teams, compared to the next biggest Ontario league, Major League Hockey, which has 5.

Intermediate B Era
From 1969 until 1977, the WOAA's premier division was an Intermediate B hockey league.  Teams that were involved were the Mount Forest Rams, Arthur Tigers, Thornbury, Harriston Blues, Milverton Four Wheel Drives, Plattsville Combines, Seaforth, Durham 72's, Listowel, Lucknow, Crediton, Atwood, Ripley, Belgrave, and Kurtzville.  The league was divided into as many as five divisions, Int. B, Major and Minor Int. C, and Major and Minor Int. D.  The teams from the Major Int. C loop dominated the WOAA in terms of Grand Championships, winning 5 of 8.  The most dominant teams were Mount Forest and Milverton.

Intermediate A Era
From 1977 until 1991, the WOAA promoted itself to the Intermediate A level.  With four major loops: A, B, C, and D; the WOAA had a wide variety of teams, including the Durham 72's, Arthur Tigers, Brussels Crusaders, Lion's Head Northstars, Woodford Royals, Ripley Roosters, Drayton Comets, St. Clements Saints, Teeswater Falcons, Lucknow Lancers, Kincardine Kings, Dundalk Flyers, Monkton Wildcats, Mitchell Red Devils, and Tara Cyclones.  As the league grew, they bought many smaller local senior leagues like the Central Ontario Hockey League, Central Grey-Bruce Hockey League and the Bruce Rural Hockey League, integrating many of their teams.  In 1991, they came to grip with the times and dropped the Intermediate moniker, relabeling itself the WOAA Senior A Hockey League.  In the 1980s, many teams jumped between the WOAA and the Ontario Hockey Association Senior leagues that attempted to operate in the area.  This era ended in 1994 with the death of the WOAA Grand Championship.  The final champions were the Durham Thundercats, who took it for the third straight year in 1994.  From 1977 until 1994, the WOAA was dominated early on by Lion's Head and Woodford and later on by Brussels and Durham.

Senior AA Era
With the collapse of Ontario Hockey Association Senior hockey, the WOAA made the move to declare itself one level below Allan Cup competition with the Senior AA moniker in 1994.  The league consolidated itself into one large league with different tiers of playoff championships: AA, A, and Sr. B until 1997.  The Durham Thundercats proved to be the team to beat early on.  Going back to the 1991–92 season, the Thundercats won 9 league championships in 15 years, including 6 out of 7 from the 1991–92 season until 1998.  In 1995, the Tavistock Royals won the first ever WOAA Senior AA championship by taking the Durham Thundercats to seven games.  The Thundercats avenged the loss by winning the next three Senior "AA" crowns.  As time went on, the Milverton Four Wheel Drives reemerged as a powerhouse in the WOAA, dominating the league in 1999, 2000, and 2002.  The Palmerston 81's and Elora Rocks also emerged as dominant forces later in the decade along with Tavistock as the Thundercats stranglehold on the league has loosened. The Saugeen Shores Winterhawks, based out of Port Elgin, have become the perennial team to beat since entering the league in 2007/08, winning the "AA" championship in 2009, 2011 and 2012.

Southern Expansion
As the league grows in popularity and proves itself with stability like no other Senior league in Ontario's history, the further South the league has been receiving applications for expansion.  Despite Ilderton having a WOAA franchise in the 1950s, the league had not been that far south in a long time.  In 2004, the WOAA allowed for the recreation of the famed Lucan-Ilderton Jets franchise, a team that dominated the Intermediate ranks in the 1960s and 1970s.  The Jets, near London set a precedent for years to come.  In 2006, the WOAA shocked many of its teams by confirming the expansion of the even more Southerly Thedford Dirty Dogs.  In 2007, the WOAA turned down Eastern expansion to the Cooks Bay Canucks as that was not where the league was interested in going.  In 2008, the Ontario Hockey Association was rocked by the defection of three of its five Major League Hockey Senior AAA teams.  Two of them applied successfully for expansion into the WOAA, the Tillsonburg Vipers and the two-time Allan Cup champion Petrolia Squires.  Also, the WOAA has made wind about further expansion to the South in former Senior AAA towns like Aylmer and Dorchester in the near future.

In the Summer of 2010, the WOAA decided to change the name of the league to the WOAA Senior AA Hockey League.  Adding the "AA" designation was to help differentiate the league from Major League Hockey which carries a "AAA" designation.  Also the league is to be divided into a Northern and Southern Conference with Northeast, Northwest, Southeast, and Southwest Divisions.  The league as well wishes to promote expansion in the league, especially to the Southeast Division.  Another change for 2010–11 is that there will only be one league championship for the first time in the league's modern history, as the league will drop both its second and third tier championships (Sr. A and Sr. B respectively).  This was changed during the 2010–11 season, the Sr. A championship and qualifier round will still be gone but the Sr. B championship and its round robin will now be known as the Sr. A championship.

Back to One Division

By 2017, the league had shrunk to 14 teams, with the departures of Walkerton, Thedford, Monkton and Komoka. With the South Division down to six teams (eight in the North), the league reverted to one division with each team playing an unbalanced schedule to reduce travel costs.

The playoff format was revised, with the top-eight teams qualifying for the Sr. "AA" championship, while the remaining five teams played for the Sr. "A" championship.

This change did nothing to stop the dynasty in Clinton, with the Radars rattling off four consecutive championships.

Much like the rest of the world, the 2020 playoffs were stopped in the semi-final round, and ultimately cancelled, by the COVID-19 pandemic, resulting in no champion being crowned for the first time in over 70 years.

On September 25, 2020, the league announced the 2020–21 season was cancelled due to the COVID-19 pandemic.

With COVID-19 restrictions loosened, the league returned for the 2021/22, with 13 teams in the fold. The Creemore Coyotes joined as an expansion team, while Elora and Tillsonburg withdrew.

The Ripley Wolves were in first place with an 11-2-1 record on January 4, 2022 when the arrival of the omicron variant of COVID-19 caused restrictions to be re-imposed, shutting down the league.

On January 12, 2022, the league announced the regular season had been declared complete and that the playoffs would begin upon resumption of play. Teams were ranked based on points-percentage due to the unequal number of games played.

The Seaforth Centenaires ended Clinton's reign as champions, knocking off the Radars in five games to capture the Sr. AA Championship.

Teams

Regular season was halted January 4, 2022 due to COVID-19 pandemic restrictions. Upon resumption of play, the season advanced directly to the playoffs

Past teams
Arthur Tigers
Brussels Crusaders
Dundalk Flyers
Durham Huskies
Drayton Comets
Drayton Icemen
Elora Rocks
Exeter Mohawks
Goderich Pirates
Grand Valley Tornados
Kincardine Kings
Komoka Classics
Lakeshore Winterhawks
Lion's Head Northstars
Listowel Jets
Lucan-Ilderton Jets
Mildmay Monarchs
Mitchell Red Devils
Monkton Wildcats
Mount Forest Rams
Nottawasaga River Rats
Palmerston 81's
Thedford Dirty Dogs
Tillsonburg Thunder
Walkerton Capitals
Wellesley Merchants
Wiarton Redmen
Wingham Bulls
Woodford Royals

Championships

WOAA Senior AA Champions

League Champion is Bolded.

WOAA Senior A & B Champions (1995–Present)

Late Intermediate Era (1978–1994)

Middle Intermediate Era (1970–1977)

Early Intermediate Era (1949–1969)

Other WOAA-sanctioned Championships
Central Grey-Bruce
1982 Tara
1981 Williamsford
1980 Desboro
1978 Chesley
Bruce County
1978 Chepstow
Central Ontario Hockey League
1982 Markdale Majors
1981 Honeywood
1980 Dundalk Flyers

See also
Western Ontario Athletic Association
Central Ontario Hockey League

References

External links
Western Ontario Athletic Association (WOAA)
WOAA Senior Hockey League
Clinton
Drayton
Exeter
Georgian Bay
Goderich
Lucan-Ilderton
Milverton
Monkton
Palmerston
Ripley
Saugeen Shores
Shallow Lake
Shelburne
Thedford
Tillsonburg
Walkerton
Wingham
Internet Hockey Database

2
Senior ice hockey